Lower Slide Lake is located in Bridger-Teton National Forest, in the U.S. state of Wyoming. The natural lake was created on June 23, 1925, when the Gros Ventre landslide dammed the Gros Ventre River. The lake was once much larger, however part of the rock dam failed less than two years later, on May 18, 1927, causing deadly flooding downstream. The lake waters have natural and stocked fish including lake and Snake River fine-spotted cutthroat trout, and mountain whitefish.

See also
Geology of the Grand Teton area

Cited references

External links

Lakes of Teton County, Wyoming
Lakes of Wyoming
Landslide-dammed lakes